The Florida Central and Peninsular Railroad was the final name of a system of railroads throughout Florida, becoming part of the Seaboard Air Line Railway in 1900. The system, including some of the first railroads in Florida, stretched from Jacksonville west through Tallahassee and south to Tampa.  Much of the FC&P network is still in service under the ownership of CSX Transportation.

History

The Tallahassee Rail Road was first organized in 1832 as the Leon Railway, changing its name in 1834. It opened in 1837, connecting Tallahassee, Florida to the Gulf of Mexico port of St. Marks, Florida. This was the second steam railroad in Florida, opening just a year after the Lake Wimico and St. Joseph Canal and Railroad.

The Florida, Atlantic and Gulf Central Railroad was chartered January 24, 1851, to build west from Jacksonville, Florida, and construction began in 1857. The Pensacola and Georgia Railroad was chartered in January 1853, to be built east from Pensacola, Florida, but started at Tallahassee. The two lines met at Lake City, Florida in 1860, and the latter also built from Tallahassee west to four miles (6 km) short of Quincy, Florida, stopping in 1863 in the middle of the American Civil War.

In 1855 the Pensacola and Georgia bought the Tallahassee. In 1869 the two merged to form the Jacksonville, Pensacola and Mobile Railroad, which obtained trackage rights over the Florida Central Railroad, the 1868 reorganization of the Florida, Atlantic and Gulf. The railroad eventually was built west to Chattahoochee, Florida, a major junction with the Pensacola and Atlantic Railroad continuing west and the Chattahoochee and East Pass Railroad running northeast. In 1882, Sir Edward Reed purchased the Jacksonville, Pensacola and Mobile, absorbing the Florida Central and reorganizing the two as the Florida Central and Western Railroad.

The Florida Railroad was incorporated January 8, 1853, to build a line across the state, from Fernandina, Florida (north of Jacksonville, Florida) southwest to Cedar Key, Florida. The first train ran in 1861, but the line failed and the company was reorganized in 1866. In 1872 it was reorganized again as the Atlantic, Gulf and West India Transit Company. In 1881, Sir Edward Reed purchased the railroad and reorganized it as the Florida Transit Company, which in 1883 was reorganized again as the Florida Transit and Peninsular Railroad. The Florida Transit and Peninsular operated two subsidiaries, the Peninsula Railroad and Tropical Florida Railroad, organized to build lines respectively from the Florida Transit at Waldo, Florida to Ocala, Florida and beyond to Tampa, Florida.

In 1884-85, Reed merged the Florida Transit and Peninsular Railroad with the Florida Central and Western Railroad, Fernandina and Jacksonville Railroad, and Leesburg and Indian River Railroad as the Florida Railway and Navigation Company, which instantly became the largest railroad system in Florida. The new company was placed in receivership in October 1885, sold at foreclosure and reorganized as the Florida Central and Peninsular Railroad Company in 1886.

On May 1, 1889, the company was reorganized again, as the Florida Central and Peninsular Railway, and on January 16, 1893, the final reorganization produced the Florida Central and Peninsular Railroad, along with a merger of the Florida Northern Railroad (a line from Yulee to Savannah, Georgia). The Seaboard Air Line Railway leased the FC&P on July 1, 1900, and the latter was merged into the former on August 15, 1903.  The FC&P tracks from Savannah, Georgia to Tampa, Florida via Jacksonville became part of Seaboard's main line.

Though a series of mergers between 1967 and 1987, the Seaboard became part of CSX Transportation.  Much of the former FC&P network remains in service today.

Routes

Main Lines (Southern and Western Divisions)

By the time the Florida Central and Peninsular Railroad reached its greatest extent in 1893, it essentially had two main lines.  One of the main lines (the Western Division) extended from Jacksonville west to Tallahassee and Chattahoochee, where it connected to the Pensacola and Atlantic Railroad (a subsidiary of the Louisville and Nashville Railroad).  The other main line (the Southern Division) was what was previously the Florida Railroad extending from Fernandina Beach to Cedar Key.  These two main lines intersected at Baldwin Junction just west of Jacksonville.  The routes continued in operation after Seaboard acquired the lines in 1900, although Seaboard designated the route to Tampa as the main line south of Waldo instead of the route to Cedar Key. 

Seaboard abandoned the former Southern Division from Archer to Cedar Key in 1932.  The line was abandoned between Callahan and Yulee in 1954. The line from Archer to Waldo was removed in the late 1980s.  Today, State Road 24 runs along much of the former right of way of the route between Waldo and Cedar Key.  The Waldo Road Greenway also runs along the former right of way between Gainesville and Waldo.  South of Baldwin, it is part of CSX's S Line.

FC&P's Southern Division is still active and in service as the following:
 First Coast Railroad (Fernandina Beach to Yulee)
 CSX (Callahan to Waldo) 
 Callahan Subdivision (Callahan to Baldwin Junction)
 Wildwood Subdivision (Baldwin to Waldo)

The Western Division remains operates as the following routes:
 CSX Jacksonville Terminal Subdivision (Jacksonville to Baldwin)
 Florida Gulf & Atlantic Railroad (Baldwin to Chattahoochee)

Tampa Division

The Tampa Division ran from the Fernandina-Cedar Key line at Waldo south to Tampa. This had been chartered as the Peninsula Railroad north of Ocala and the Tropical Florida Railroad south of Ocala.  After the Seaboard acquisition, this route became the southernmost segment of their main line.  It subsequently became part of CSX's S Line.

While mostly intact, a short 16-mile segment of the S Line has been abandoned between Lacoochee and Zephyrhills, where the line now briefly detours along a former Atlantic Coast Line route (using former South Florida Railroad and Tampa and Thonotosassa Railroad trackage).  Despite not being part of the original line, this former Atlantic Coast Line segment is considered to be an unofficial part of the S Line since it carries all S Line traffic.

The Tampa Division now operates as the following routes on the S Line:
 Wildwood Subdivision (Waldo to Lacoochee)
 Yeoman Subdivision (Zephyrhills to east of Tampa)
 Tampa Terminal Subdivision (east of Tampa to Gary)

Northern Division

The Fernandina and Jacksonville Railroad was organized in 1874 and opened in 1881, connecting Jacksonville north to the Southern Division at Yulee. It was consolidated into the Florida Railway and Navigation Company in 1885.

The South Bound Railroad was organized in 1887 and completed in 1891, connecting Columbia, South Carolina to Savannah, Georgia. The FC&P leased it in 1893. In 1892 the Florida Northern Railroad was chartered by the FC&P to continue the Fernandina and Jacksonville Railroad north into Georgia, where the FC&P continued the line to Savannah. This opened in 1894, forming a continuous line from Jacksonville to Columbia. In 1899 and 1900, the South Bound Railroad was extended north to Camden, South Carolina to meet the Seaboard Air Line Railway's Chesterfield and Kershaw Railroad.  The Northern Division became part of the Seaboard main line after the Seaboard acquisition.

In 1925, the Gross Cutoff was built by Seaboard from the Northern Division near the Florida/Georgia state line southwest to the Southern Division at Callahan.

The Northern Division remains today in segments.  The abandoned segment within Jacksonville is now the S-Line Urban Greenway.  

After the Seaboard Coast Line became the CSX Corporation in the 1980s, CSX abandoned the S Line between Riceboro, Georgia (just southwest of Savannah) and Bladen, Georgia in 1986.  Track between Bladen and Seals was removed in 1990.

The Northern Division is now the following routes:
 CSX (Camden, South Carolina to Savannah, Georgia)
 Hamlet Subdivision (Camden, South Carolina to Columbia, South Carolina)
 Columbia Subdivision (Columbia to Savannah, Georgia)
 Savannah Subdivision West Route (within Savannah)
 Riceboro Southern Railway (Ogechee, Georgia to Riceboro, Georgia)
 First Coast Railroad (Seals, Georgia to Yulee, Florida)
 CSX Kingsland Subdivision (Yulee to Jacksonville)

Orlando Division

The Leesburg and Indian River Railroad was incorporated in 1884 and merged into the Florida Railway and Navigation Company in 1885. It built a line from the Tampa Division at Wildwood east to Tavares, with plans to continue east to Titusville. That extension was not built, but pieces were built by other companies.

The Tavares, Orlando and Atlantic Railroad was incorporated in 1883, and built an extension of line from Tavares to Orlando. The FC&P leased it in 1891.

The Orlando and Winter Park Railway was incorporated in 1886 and extended the line from Orlando to Winter Park. The Osceola and Lake Jesup Railway, incorporated 1888, continued the line past Oviedo to Lake Charm. In 1891 the two companies merged into the East Florida and Atlantic Railroad, which was leased by the FC&P in 1892.  In the line's early days, passenger trains served the historic Church Street Station in Orlando, which belonged to the South Florida Railroad.  Trains turned onto the South Florida Railroad (which became the main line of the Atlantic Coast Line Railroad, the Seaboard Air Line's competitor) in Downtown Orlando just north of the station.  In 1896, the FC&P built its own Orlando station.

The line west of Orlando remained intact under Seaboard and its successors until the 1970s when tracks were removed between Leesburg and Tavares.  Since 1986, the remaining line from Tavares to Orlando has been operated by the Florida Central Railroad, a short line that was run by the Pinsly Railroad Company from 1986 to 2019 and is now operated by Regional Rail, LLC.  The Florida Midland Railroad, another Pinsly-operated short line, operated the segment from Wildwood to Leesburg from 1987 until 2005, when most of that end of the line was abandoned.  All that remains on the Wildwood end is a short wye which CSX uses to turn locomotives from Wildwood Yard.

East of Orlando, the abandoned right of way is now the Cady Way Trail and the southern extension of the Cross Seminole Trail.

Other Branches
Monticello
The Monticello Branch ran from the Western Division at Drifton north to Monticello.

Amelia Beach
The Fernandina and Amelia Beach Railway was organized in 1883 to run from Fernandina at the end of the Southern Division south to Amelia Beach. The FC&P leased it in 1891, and it was abandoned around 1900.

Wannee
The Wannee Branch was originally part of the Atlantic, Suwannee River and Gulf Railway.  It branched off the Southern Division at Starke and headed west to Wannee.  Construction of the line began in 1863.  The line was bought by the FC&P in 1899 and it was completed to Wannee in 1902.  The branch remains in service as part of CSX's Brooker Subdivision from Starke to a point just west of LaCrosse.  The branch's connection with the main line is still known as Wannee Junction.

Early Bird
The branch to Early Bird was built in 1890 and branched off the Southern Division in Archer.  The line gained more prominence in the Seaboard era.  Seaboard extended the branch south through Dunnellon and Hernando to Inverness in 1911.  The Brooksville and Inverness Railway, a Seaboard subsidiary, extended it further south to Brooksville in 1925 to connect with the Tampa Northern Railroad.  This created an alternate route into Tampa, which the Seaboard Air Line designated as the Brooksville Subdivision. Much of this line was removed in the late 1970s.

Silver Springs
The short Silver Springs branch from Ocala east to Silver Springs was built along with the Tampa Division.  The Seaboard Air Line later leased this branch to the Ocala Northern Railroad in 1909.  The Ocala Northern extended the line to Palatka by 1912.  The Ocala Northern was reorganized as the Ocklawaha Valley Railroad in 1915, but the line was abandoned by 1922.

Lake Weir
The Lake Weir Branch ran from Summerfield east to South Lake Weir, and was built along with the Tampa Division.

Sumterville
The short Sumterville branch from Sumterville Junction to Sumterville was built with the Tampa Division.

St. Marks
The St. Mark's branch was built by the Tallahassee Railroad ran from Tallahassee south.  It was one of the first operating railroads in Florida.  It's become the longest-operating railroad in Florida at 147 years.  It was abandoned in 1983.  The Florida Park Service currently maintains it as the Tallahassee-St. Marks Historic Railroad State Trail.  

Whitehall

Historic stations
Southern Division

Tampa Division

Western Division

Orlando Division

Northern Division

Notes

References

External links

Railroad History Database
Bruce Roberts, Tampa Tribune Correspondent, Florida's Forgotten Railroad (1954)
Confederate Railroads
Georgia's Railroad History and Heritage - Florida Central & Peninsular Railroad

Defunct Florida railroads
Predecessors of the Seaboard Air Line Railroad
Railway companies established in 1888
Railway companies disestablished in 1903
Defunct Georgia (U.S. state) railroads
Defunct South Carolina railroads
5 ft gauge railways in the United States